Manta Matcher is a global online database for manta rays. It is one of the Wildbook Web applications developed by Wild Me, a 501(c)(3) not-for-profit organization in the United States, and was created in partnership with Andrea Marshall of the Marine Megafauna Foundation.

Manta rays have unique spot patterning on their undersides, which allows for individual identification. Scuba divers around the world can photograph mantas and upload their manta identification photographs to the Manta Matcher website, supporting global research and conservation efforts.

Manta Matcher is a pattern-matching software that eases researcher workload; key spot pattern features are extracted using a scale-invariant feature transform (SIFT) algorithm, which can cope with complications presented by highly variable spot patterns and low contrast photographs.

This citizen science tool is free to use by researchers worldwide. Manta Matcher represents a global initiative to centralize manta ray sightings and facilitate research on these vulnerable species through collaborative studies, including the cross-referencing of regional databases.

Manta Matcher has already supported research that contributed to the listing of reef mantas (Manta alfredi) on Appendix 1 of the Convention on Migratory Species in November 2014.

References

External links 
 

Myliobatidae
Online databases
Biodiversity databases